Nitro High School is a public high school in the city of Nitro in Kanawha County, West Virginia. It is one of eight public high schools in the Kanawha County School District.

History 
The current building was built in 1959, and used as a junior high school. The facility was expanded in 1966, and again in 1992 to its current iteration. Formerly, the high school was located in the heart of the business district on 21st Street. That building is now occupied by the Nitro Community Center and owned by Kings Way Christian Church.

Performing arts
Nitro has two competitive show choirs, the mixed-gender Showcats and the women's-only Sophisticats.

Notable alumni
J.R. House, Major League Baseball catcher and coach
Kathy Mattea, Grammy award-winning country music artist 
Lew Burdette, Major League Baseball pitcher

References

External links

Kanawha County Schools website

Schools in Kanawha County, West Virginia
Public high schools in West Virginia
Educational institutions established in 1917
1917 establishments in West Virginia